ICPAS may refer to:

 Institute of Certified Public Accountants in Israel
 Institute of Certified Public Accountants of Singapore
 Illinois CPA Society, a US professional society of Certified Public Accountants
 Indiana CPA Society